Michal Bernasik (born 1979) is a German-Polish architect, designer and urbanist.
After practicing at Ron Arad's in London, he set up his own practice in Cologne, Germany in 2006. Since then he has worked and cooperated with many great figures of architecture, culture and art. He is laureate of several architectural prizes and winner of many international competitions.

References

See also

National Museum's Forum
Max Ernst Museum
Bertelsmann Unter den Linden 1

1979 births
Living people
Architects from Cologne
21st-century German architects
21st-century Polish architects